Captain America is a comic book superhero in the . Since 1941, he has starred in several ongoing series, as well as many limited series and specials. All stories are published exclusively by Marvel Comics under their standard imprint, unless otherwise noted.

Primary series
 Captain America Comics #1–75 (Timely Comics; March 1941 – February 1950)
 Captain America #76-78 (Atlas Comics; May 1954 - September 1954)
 Tales of Suspense #59–99 (November 1964 – March 1968)
 Captain America #100–454 (April 1968 – August 1996)
 Captain America Annual #1–13 (1971–1972; 1976–1977; 1981–1983; 1986; 1990–1994)
 Captain America vol. 2 #1–13 [#455–467] (November 1996 – November 1997)
 Captain America vol. 3 #1–50 [#468–517] (January 1998 – February 2002)
 Captain America/Citizen V Annual 1998
 Captain America Annual 1999 – 2001
 Captain America vol. 4 #1–32 [#518–549] (June 2002 – December 2004)
 Captain America vol. 5 #1–50 [#550–599] (January 2005 – July 2009)
 Captain America #600–619 (August 2009 – August 2011)
 Captain America and Bucky #620–628 (September 2011 – May 2012)
 Captain America and Hawkeye #629–632 (June–August 2012)
 Captain America and Iron Man #633–635 (August–October 2012)
 Captain America and Namor #635.1 (October 2012)
 Captain America and Black Widow #636–640 (November 2012 – February 2013)
 Captain America vol. 6 #1–19 [#620–638] (September 2011 – December 2012)
 Captain America vol. 7 #1–25 [#639–663] (January 2013 – December 2014)
 All-New Captain America #1–6 [#664–669] (January 2015 –  June 2015)
 All-New Captain America Special #1 (July 2015)
 Captain America: Sam Wilson #1–24 [#670–693] (October 2015 – July 2017)
 Captain America: Steve Rogers #1–19 (May 2016 – July 2017)
 Captain America vol. 8 #25 [#694] (August 2017)
 Captain America #695–704 (November 2017 – June 2018)
 Captain America vol. 9 #1–30 [#705–734] (July 2018 – July 2021)
 Captain America vol. 10 #0 [#735] (April 2022)
 Captain America: Symbol of Truth #1– [#736– ] (May 2022 – )
 Captain America: Sentinel of Liberty vol. 2 #1– (June 2022 – )

Timeline

Spin-off series
 Nomad #1–25 (May 1992 – May 1994)
 Captain America: Sentinel of Liberty #1–12 (September 1998 – August 1999)
 Captain America and the Falcon #1–14 (May 2004 – June 2005)
 Winter Soldier #1–19 (April 2012 – June 2013)
 Bucky Barnes: The Winter Soldier #1–11 (December 2014 – November 2015)
Team America #1–12 (May 1982 – May 1983)

Limited series and one-shots
 Marvel Treasury Edition: Captain America's Bicentennial Battles (June 1976)
 Falcon #1–4 (November 1983 – February 1984)
 Nomad #1–4 (November 1990 – February 1991)
 U.S. Agent #1–4 (June – September 1993)
 Iron Man/Captain America #1998 (January 1999)
 U.S. Agent vol. 2 #1–3 (August – October 2001)
 Captain America: Dead Men Running #1–3 (February – May 2002)
 Captain America: Red, White & Blue (September 2002)
 Truth: Red, White & Black #1–7 (January – July 2003)
 Captain America: What Price Glory? #1–4 (March 2003)
 Winter Soldier: Winter Kills (February 2007)
 Fallen Son: The Death of Captain America #1–5 (June – August 2007)
 Captain America: The Chosen #1–6 (November 2007 – March 2008)
 Captain America: Reborn #1–6 (September 2009 – March 2010)
 Captain America: Who Will Wield the Shield? (February 2010)
 Captain America: Who Won't Wield the Shield? (June 2010)
 Captain America/Black Panther: Flags of Our Fathers (June – September 2010)
 Steve Rogers: Super-Soldier #1–4 (September – December 2010)
 Captain America: Forever Allies #1–4 (October 2010 – January 2011)
 Captain America: Patriot #1–4 (November 2010 – February 2011)
 Captain America: Man Out of Time #1–5 (January – May 2011)
 Captain America: Hail Hydra #1–5 (March – July 2011)
 Ultimate Comics: Captain America #1–4 (March – June 2011)
 Captain America and the Falcon (May 2011)
 Captain America Corps #1–5 (August – December 2011)
 Captain America: Living Legend (October – December 2013)
 All-New Captain America: Fear Him (April 2015)
 Captain America: White #1–5 (July – December 2015)

Spotlight series
 All Winners #1–19, 21 (Summer 1941 – Winter 1946)
 All-Select Comics #1–10 (Fall 1943 – Summer 1946)
 USA #6–17 (December 1942 – Fall 1945)

Writers
 Captain America Comics
 Joe Simon #1–10
 Jack Kirby #1–6
 Stan Lee #3, 5–6, 8, 10–14, 16–18, 22
 Unknown #15, 19–21, 23–73
 Captain America
 Stan Lee #100–141, 216, 400, 600, Annual #1-2
 Gary Friedrich #142–148
 Gerry Conway #149–152
 Steve Englehart #153–167, 169–186
 John Warner #186–188
 Tony Isabella #189–191
 Bill Mantlo #191, 256, 291
 Marv Wolfman #192
 Jack Kirby #193–214, Annual #3–4
 Roy Thomas #168, 215–217, 423, Annual #9, 11, 13
 Don Glut #217–221
 Scott Edelman #220–221
 David Kraft #221, 265–266, 271, 273–274
 Steve Gerber #157, 221–223, 225
 Peter Gillis #224, 238–239, 246, Annual #7
 Roger McKenzie #226–237, 243–245, 250
 Paul Kupperberg and Alan Kupperberg #240
 Mike Barr #241, 257
 Steve Grant #242
 Roger Stern #230, 247–255
 John Byrne #247, 249, 253–254
 Jim Shooter #232, 250, 257, 259 
 Chris Claremont #257–258
 David Michelinie #258–259, Annual #5
 Al Milgrom #260
 J.M. DeMatteis #261–264, 267–270, 272, 275–290, 292–300, Annual #6
 Michael Carlin #301–306
 Mark Gruenwald #307–422, 424–443, Annual #8, 10-12
 Mark Waid #444–454, 695–704, Vol. 3 #1–23, Iron Man/Captain America Annual 1998
 Rob Liefeld vol. 2 #1–6
 Jeph Loeb vol. 2 #1–6, 12
 James Robinson vol. 2 #7–11, 13
 Tom DeFalco vol. 3 #24
 Dan Jurgens vol. 3 #25–50, Annual 2000-2001
 Kurt Busiek and Barbara Kesel Captain America/Citizen V Annual 1998
 Joe Casey Annual 1999
 Bill Rosemann vol. 3 #20–21, Annual 2000
 John Ney Rieber vol. 4 #1–9, 12
 Chuck Austen vol. 4 #8–16
 Dave Gibbons vol. 4 #17–20
 Robert Morales vol. 4 #21–28
 Robert Kirkman vol. 4 #29–32
 Ed Brubaker vol. 5 #1–50, #600–619, vol. 6 #1–19
 Rick Remender vol. 7 #1–25
 Nick Spencer vol. 8 #25
 Ta-Nehisi Coates vol. 9 #1–30
 Collin Kelly and Jackson Lanzing vol. 10 #1
 Tochi Onyebuchi vol. 10 #1
 All-New Captain America
 Rick Remender #1–6
 Captain America: Sam Wilson
 Nick Spencer #1–24
 Captain America: Steve Rogers
 Nick Spencer #1–19
Captain America: Sentinel Of Liberty
Collin Kelly and Jackson Lanzing vol. 2 #1-present
Captain America: Symbol Of Truth
Tochi Onyebuchi #1-present

Collected editions

Marvel Masterworks: Golden Age Captain America

Marvel Masterworks: Captain America

Essential Captain America

Captain America Epic Collections

Captain America (vols. 1 and 2)

Captain America (vols. 3 and 4, Marvel Knights, Cap/Falcon)

Captain America (Brubaker era)

Marvel NOW!: Captain America

All-New Captain America / Captain America: Sam Wilson / Captain America: Steve Rogers

Captain America (Waid era)

Captain America (vol. 9)

Captain America: Sentinel Of Liberty / Captain America: Symbol Of Truth

Captain America Omnibus

References

Lists of comic book titles
Lists of comics by character
Lists of comics by Marvel Comics
Titles